Pietro Sassi (18 July 1834 – 30 December 1905) was an Italian painter.

He was born in Alessandria and resident in Rome, where he painted genre and both urban and rural vedute paintings. Le Sponde del Lago di Garda in Tirolo were exhibited at the 1880 Exhibition of Fine Arts in Turin, while two landscapes where exhibited in the next year in Milan. In 1863 in Rome, he exhibited: The Roman Lowlands; Il temporale in mare, and The North Sea; as well as some twelve other painted outdoors, including Un bosco di querce negli Appennini romani and The Arch of Septimus Severus in the Roman Forum.

In the 1884 Exposition of Turin, and at the 1887 National Artistic Exposition in Venice were three paintings depicting: Uva fresca; Uva appassita and Una Foresta.

One of his pupils was Cesare Tallone.

Sassi died in Rome in 1905.

References

1834 births
1905 deaths
Painters from Rome
19th-century Italian painters
Italian male painters
20th-century Italian painters
19th-century Italian male artists
20th-century Italian male artists